HMS Odin was a British  submarine operated by the Royal Navy.

Design and construction

The Oberon class was a direct follow on of the Porpoise-class, with the same dimensions and external design, but updates to equipment and internal fittings, and a higher grade of steel used for fabrication of the pressure hull.

Displacement was 1,610 tons standard, 2,030 tons full load when surfaced, and 2,410 tons full load when submerged. Eight  diameter torpedo tubes were fitted (six facing forward, two aft), with a total payload of 24 torpedoes. The boats were fitted with Type 186 and Type 187 sonars, and an I-band surface search radar. The standard complement was 68: 6 officers, 62 sailors.

Odin was laid down by Cammell Laird on 27 April 1959, and launched on 4 November 1960. The boat was commissioned into the Royal Navy on 3 May 1962.

Decommissioning and fate
Odin was decommissioned on 18 October 1990. She was sold for scrap in Greece in October 1991.

References

Publications
 

 

Oberon-class submarines of the Royal Navy
Ships built on the River Mersey
1960 ships
Cold War submarines of the United Kingdom